Thaton is a town in Mon State, in southern Myanmar on the Tenasserim plains. Thaton lies along the National Highway 8 and is also connected by the National Road 85. It is 230 km south east of Yangon and 70 km north of Mawlamyine. Thaton was the capital of Thaton Kingdom from at least the 4th century BC to the middle of the 11th century AD.

Etymology
Thaton is the Burmese name of Sadhuim (သဓီု) in Mon, which in turn is from Sudhammapura in Pali, after Sudharma, the moot hall of the gods.

History

Thaton was the capital of the Thaton Kingdom, a Mon Kingdom which ruled present day Lower Burma between the 4th and 11th centuries. Like the Burmans and the Thais, some modern Mons have tried to identify their ethnicity and, specifically this kingdom at Thaton, with the semi-historical kingdom of Suwarnabhumi ("The Golden Land"); today, this claim is contested by many different ethnicities in south-east Asia, and contradicted by scholars. Historical scholarship indicates that the early usage of the term (as found in the edicts of Ashoka of India, who sent Buddhist missionaries there in the 3rd century BC) indicated a location in southern India, and not in south-east Asia.

In the kingdom of Dvaravati, Thaton was an important seaport on the Gulf of Martaban, for trade with India and Sri Lanka. Shin Arahan, also called Dhammadassi, a monk born in Thaton and raised and educated in Nakhon Pathom, an old capital of the Mon kingdom of Dvaravadi, now in Thailand, took Theravada Buddhism north to the Burmese kingdom of Bagan. In 1057, King Anawrahta of Bagan conquered Thaton.

Geography

Climate

Health care 
 Thaton District Hospital

Education 
Thaton is home to Computer University (Thaton), which offers five-year bachelor's degree programs in computer science and computer technology. It is also the home of Thaton Institute of Agriculture.

References

External links

 http://www.eumon.org/Script_kyanlyani.php

Township capitals of Myanmar
Populated places in Mon State
Old Cities of Mon people